Viola Gertrude Wells Evans (December 14, 1902, Newark, New Jersey – December 22, 1984, Belleville, New Jersey), better known by her stage names Viola Wells or Miss Rhapsody, was an American jazz, blues, and religious singer.

The book Swing City: Newark Nightlife, 1925-50 by Barbara J. Kukla is dedicated to Viola Wells.

Early life
Wells was the first child of Robert Olivia Simmons and Earle Henry Wells, who had moved to Newark from Surry County, Virginia. She had three siblings: Isabelle, Estelle, and Earle. When her mother died from giving birth to her sister Estelle, she briefly went to live with her maternal grandparents Rev. Morgan and Annie Simmons in Virginia. Rev. Morgan was a Baptist minister who only liked to listen to secular music. In contrast, his son "Uncle Charlie" was popular locally for his song and dance routines.

She returned to Newark, New Jersey, in 1910 after her father remarried. She started to sing in her church's Salika Johnson choir under the direction of her music and piano teacher, Ruth Reid. This choir traveled to cities outside of New Jersey to perform. WOR Radio in Newark invited her to sing on air to raise money for the first Black YMCA. She also sang on the glee club in her high school and in talent shows.

Her first marriage was to Howard Nicholas when she was nineteen.

Career
Her career began with singing in traveling shows. She once filled in for Mamie Smith. She was in a TOBA circuit in 1921. Wells frequently sang at local Newark jazz clubs and eventually moved to Harlem to sing at nightclubs there. She eventually began touring throughout the US with different bands in the 1920s. In the 1930s, her first big break was touring with the Banjo Bernie Band from Baltimore and then with Ida Cox. At the end of the 1930s, she moved to Kansas City, where she ran a nightclub and headed a band.

She moved back to Newark in the 1940s, where she met and married guitarist Harold Underhill. She began to sing at various New York City clubs (such as Harlem's Apollo Theater), occasionally under the name "Viola Underhill". She replaced Helen Humes as a singer in the Count Basie Orchestra. By the 1940s, she was often billed as "The Ebony Stick Of Dynamite". She also sang at United Service Organizations shows at military bases.

She was a singer on the album Encore For The Chicago Blues released in 1968 by Spivey Records. She produced a blues album on 22 April 1972 called Miss Rhapsody.

Retirement and death
She retired from music in 1946 due to diabetes, and in an effort to spend more time with her family after her father was murdered. She was brought out of retirement twice in her life; first, by blues historian Sheldon Harris who helped revive her career in the 1960s. The second time, she toured with the Harlem Blues and Jazz Band in the 1970s. A fan in London stepped on her foot, which in her condition eventually led to its amputation. She received many honors in her later years, including the key to Newark. She died in December 1984, and is buried in Heavenly Rest Cemetery in East Hanover, New Jersey.

References

External links

1902 births
1984 deaths
American jazz singers
Newark jazz
20th-century American singers
Harlem Blues and Jazz Band members